Sona College of Technology (Autonomous) is a private college in India located in Salem, Tamilnadu, India. It was established in 1997 by Thiru. M.S. Chockalingam (Founder Chairman) and gained autonomous status in 2012. It is  National Board of Accreditation (NBA) accredited, ISO certified and Accredited "A" Grade by National Assessment and Accreditation Council (NAAC). The college affiliated with Anna University and approved by the All India Council for Technical Education (AICTE) of the government of India.

Admission 
The selection committee constituted by Sona College of Technology as per the guidelines of the Institution will do a selection of the candidates under this scheme. The selection is purely provisional and always subject to the confirmation from the Anna University / Directorate of Technical Education (DoTE). Chennai. ME/M.Tech/MBA/MCA Degree admissions are based on the entrance (TANCET/CET/GATE/MAT) marks conducted by the Anna University & Association of Management of Coimbatore Anna University Affiliated Colleges.

Rankings

The National Institutional Ranking Framework (NIRF) ranked it 150 among engineering colleges in 2020.

Facilities 
Sona College is situated at the heart of the "Steel City", Salem which is a well-known district in Tamilnadu, South India. The College is one kilometre from the Salem Junction Railway Station and three kilometres from Salem Central Bus Stand. Located in an Arcadian environment, adjoining Thiagarajar Polytechnic, its elder sister, the college has a sprawling campus of 34.5 acres with a 7,50,000 sq.feet built-up area.

Library:  The Library has developed an excellent collection of books, journals and non-book material in science, engineering, technology, humanities, social sciences, and management. The Library has 80000+ books, 2500+ CDs. 2000+ National/International Journals. and Our Library is an institutional member in DELNET, IIM (B), TERI & INSDAG

Hostel:  Separate hostel facilities are available for Indian and NRI boys and girls. The Hostel Included with Large Dinning hall, Swimming Pool, Gym, Indoor, and outdoor sports facilities.

Apple Lab:  Sona College of Technology is the first college to implement Apple lab within the campus, which has incredible infrastructure equipped with 15 iMac 21.5 inch and 20 Mac mini systems.

Industry tie-up 
The college has tied-up with Cisco Systems, Oracle, IBM, Infosys Campus Connect, Wipro Mission, British Council, and Sun Academic Initiative.

R&D centers

Sona College’s commitment to advanced research in the areas of Science, Engineering, and Technology have nurtured 36 centres of excellence.

Mechanical Engineering:
Centre for Robotics and Nonlinear Dynamics - CRND
Centre for Nano Materials / Micro Machining - CNM/MM
Centre for Analysis and Optimization of Metal forming Process - METFORM

Electrical and Electronics Engineering:
Sona Special Power Electronics & Electric Drives - SonaSPEED
Sona Electric Power Engineering Research & Testing Centre - SonaPERT
Sona Power Electronics Drives and Controllers - SonaPEDAC

Computer Science and Engineering:
Sona Network - SonaNET
Centre for Data Mining and Database Technology - SonaMINE

Information Technology
Centre for Web Services and Development - SonaWEB
Center for Research and Development of Free Open Source Software - CRDFOSS

Electronics and Communication Engineering:
Sona Signal and Image Processing Research Centre - SonaSIPRO
Centre for VLSI Systems and Communication Technology - VLSIComm

Civil Engineering:
Centre for Concrete Innovation - SonaCOIN
Structural Engineering Research Centre - SonaSERC

Advanced Research in Sciences and Humanities & Languages:
Centre for Photonics and Nanotechnology - SonaPAN
Centre for study on Rainfall and Radio wave Propagation - SonaCRRP
Sona Science centre for Testing and Applied ResearCH - SonaSTARCH
Nanoscience Center for Optoelectronics and Energy Devices (Nano-COED)
SONA Centre for Advanced Organic Materials - SonaAROMA

Master of Business Administration:
Centre for Research and Publication in Business Management - SONACRP

Master of Computer Applications:
Smart Security and Analytics - SONAS2A

Fashion Technology:
Sona Centre for Research and Extension activities - SonaREACH

References

External links
Official website

Engineering colleges in Tamil Nadu
Colleges affiliated to Anna University
Education in Salem, Tamil Nadu